Michal Novák (born 26 October 1996) is a Czech cross-country skier. He competed in the 2018 Winter Olympics.

Cross-country skiing results
All results are sourced from the International Ski Federation (FIS).

Olympic Games

Distance reduced to 30 km due to weather conditions.

World Championships

World Cup

Season standings

References

1996 births
Living people
Olympic cross-country skiers of the Czech Republic
Cross-country skiers at the 2018 Winter Olympics
Cross-country skiers at the 2022 Winter Olympics
Czech male cross-country skiers
Tour de Ski skiers
Sportspeople from Karlovy Vary